Pan Sorasak (born 30 October 1955) is the current Minister of Commerce of the Royal Government of Cambodia. He was re-appointed to this position in September 2018 for the 6th legislature, having served in the same position during the 5th legislature when he was appointed in April 2016.

Career
Since 2008, he was Secretary of State (Vice Minister) at the Ministry of Commerce, and he was responsible for the Strategic Trade Policy and International Trade Cooperation. He also led a task force among others, on the ratification of Cambodia’s Trade Facilitation Agreement for the WTO’s Bali Package (2013-2016).

Under his leadership, the Ministry of Commerce has pushed for the finalization of many draft laws and various amendments including consumer protection, food safety, competition, secured transaction and trade remedy. He is recognized as one of the main drivers of the use of information and communication technologies (ICT) in SMEs development to increase their competitiveness.

He initiated and led the implementation of the Ministry's ICT Master Plan and Trade Information Website and was responsible for the modernization of the Ministry's ICT infrastructure. Prior to that he initiated the drafting of the E-Commerce Law, the e-Ministry initiative, as well as the creation and standardization of Khmer Unicode script in computers.

Before joining the public sector, Sorasak spent his career in the private sector for 18 years, occupying various senior positions (up to Corporate Vice President) with UNOCAL, an American multinational oil and gas exploration company in the United States, Indonesia, Thailand and Singapore and headed its country office in Cambodia. He also worked as a Researcher for the United States Air Force and the Pentagon.

Sorasak has served in a number organizations including as member of the Board of Architects of Cambodia, Vice Chairman of the National Standard Board, the National Statistical Board, National Council of Science & Technology (NCST) and the American Cambodian Business Council (AmCam).

See also
 Ministry of Commerce
 Ministry of Commerce Facebook Page
Cabinet of Cambodia

References 

Living people
Government ministers of Cambodia
1955 births